James Solomon "Big Jim" Nance (December 30, 1942 – June 17, 1992) was an American professional football player who was a fullback with the Boston Patriots during their days in the American Football League (AFL). He was inducted into the Patriots Hall of Fame in 2009. He played college football for the Syracuse Orangemen.

High school career
While attending Indiana (PA) Joint High School, Nance was a two-time Pennsylvania heavyweight wrestling champion in 1960 and 1961. It is said that the PIAA  (PA's governing body) added the heavyweight class to accommodate Nance, who was too large for their highest weight class in 1959, which was 185 pounds.

College career
Starting for three years at Syracuse University, Nance tied the school record for career touchdowns (13) and led the Orangemen in rushing in 1964, scoring in ten straight games. In 1963 and 1965, Nance was also the NCAA wrestling heavyweight National Champion and received All-America honors.

Professional career
Nance was a 19th round selection of the Boston Patriots in the 1965 AFL Draft, as well as a 4th round selection of the Chicago Bears in the 1965 NFL Draft. Nance signed with the Patriots. Though his rookie season was unimpressive, he led the AFL in rushing the next two seasons. He went on to become the only AFL player ever to rush for more than 1,400 yards in a season. At 6-1 and 260 pounds, Nance was a powerful fullback who carried 299 times in 1966, for 11 touchdowns and 1,458 yards. That season, he rushed for 208 yards and two touchdowns in a 24–21 victory over the Oakland Raiders.

Nance was an American Football League All-Star in 1966, when he also received the league's Most Valuable Player award, and an All-Star again in 1967 when he became the only AFL player to have consecutive seasons with over 1,000 yards, this time 1,216. He retired as the Patriots' all-time leader in rushing touchdowns with 45, a record he still holds.

In 1972, he was traded to the Philadelphia Eagles but refused to play for them, temporarily retiring. He joined the New York Jets the following year.

In 1974, Nance played with the Houston Texans/Shreveport Steamer of the World Football League, rushing for 1,240 yards. In 1975, he ran for 767 yards before the WFL folded. He is the all-time leading rusher in the WFL with 490 carries for 2,007 yards and a 4.1 average. He rushed for 15 touchdowns in his WFL career.

Death
Nance suffered a heart attack and stroke in 1983. He died on June 17, 1992, of a heart attack in Quincy, Massachusetts.

References

External links
 New England Patriots bio
 The Pennsylvania Football News All-Century Team
 Jim Nance obituary – New York Times

1942 births
1992 deaths
American Football League Most Valuable Players
American Football League All-Star players
American football running backs
Players of American football from Pennsylvania
Boston Patriots players
New England Patriots players
New York Jets players
Houston Texans (WFL) players
Shreveport Steamer players
American Football League rushing leaders
People from Indiana, Pennsylvania
Syracuse Orange football players
New England Patriots announcers
National Football League announcers
American Football League players